Apex Airport (or Airpark) is a private airstrip almost exactly two miles due west of Kitsap Mall in Silverdale, Washington, at elevation . The runway, originally a bulldozed gravel strip, was built in 1946.

References

External links
Apex Airpark (Washington State Department of Transportation information page)

1946 establishments in Washington (state)
Airports in Washington (state)
Transportation buildings and structures in Kitsap County, Washington